Afromarengo is a genus of jumping spiders that was first described by S. P. Benjamin in 2004. The name is derived from "Africa" and the genus Marengo. The genus Indomarengo is similarly named.

Species
 it contained four species, found only in Africa:
Afromarengo bimaculata (Peckham & Peckham, 1903) – South Africa
Afromarengo coriacea (Simon, 1900) (type) – Central, East, Southern Africa
Afromarengo lyrifera (Wanless, 1978) – Angola, Tanzania
Afromarengo plana Haddad & Wesolowska, 2013 – South Africa

References

Salticidae
Salticidae genera
Spiders of Africa